Juan Zaragoza may refer to:

 Juan Zaragoza (accountant) (born 1959), Puerto Rican accountant and Secretary of Treasury
 Juan Zaragoza (footballer) (born 1984), Mexican footballer